"Miffy's Simplicity" is a song by Australian rock band Regurgitator. The song was released in September 1996 as the third  and final (commercially released) single from the band's debut studio album Tu-Plang. The single peaked at number 54 in Australia.

The song is a love song Quan Yeomans wrote once he began dating Janet from Spiderbait. Yeomans said "This is probably the only real love song I have ever written. We stopped playing it for the simple reason that when love affairs end the love songs written about them tend to ring a little hollow for the troubadour whose heart has faltered. I do, however, still really like the song's odd chord progressions, bass tone and its cute, romance lyrics scattered over heavily distorted guitars. It is actually one of the few vocal takes of mine that I think works on the record."

Track listings

Charts

Release history

References

 

1996 singles
1995 songs
Regurgitator songs
Songs written by Quan Yeomans
Song recordings produced by Magoo (Australian producer)
Warner Music Australasia singles